Sabeel Ghazi (Arabic:سبيل غازي) (born 17 November 1994) is an Emirati footballer who plays for Al Dhaid as a defender.

References

External links
 

Emirati footballers
1994 births
Living people
Al Ahli Club (Dubai) players
Al-Nasr SC (Dubai) players
Hatta Club players
Emirates Club players
Dibba Al-Hisn Sports Club players
Al Dhaid SC players
UAE Pro League players
UAE First Division League players
Association football defenders